Kričke may refer:

Kričke, Šibenik-Knin County, a village near Drniš, Croatia
Kričke, Požega-Slavonia County, a village near Pakrac, Croatia
Kričke, Sisak-Moslavina County, a village near Novska, Croatia